Sandra "Sandy" Shellworth (December 18, 1944 – January 10, 2019) was an alpine ski racer from the United States.

Born in Annapolis, Maryland, Shellworth was raised in Boise, Idaho, where her father, Eugene Shellworth was mayor (1961–66). A 1962 graduate of Boise High, she raced for Bogus Basin, the University of Colorado, and the U.S. Ski Team.

Shellworth won the Roch Cup downhill in Aspen in 1967, and was the 1967 U.S. Champion in giant slalom at Missoula, but broke her leg hours later training for the downhill. Shellworth was the first woman from CU to participate in the Olympics; she competed in the 1968 Winter Olympics at Grenoble and finished 21st in the women's downhill at Chamrousse. Her best finish in a World Cup event was 12th in the downhill at Schruns, Austria, in January 1967.

Olympic results

From 1948 through 1980, the alpine skiing events at the Winter Olympics also served as the World Championships, held every two years.

References

External links
 Sports-Reference.com – Olympic results – Sandy Shellworth

1944 births
American female alpine skiers
Olympic alpine skiers of the United States
Alpine skiers at the 1968 Winter Olympics
University of Colorado alumni
People from Boise, Idaho
People from Annapolis, Maryland
Sportspeople from Idaho
2019 deaths
21st-century American women